Stuart Golabek (born 5 November 1974 in Inverness) is a Scottish retired professional footballer who last played for Highland League side Brora Rangers.

Career
Golabek began his career with Highland League side Clachnacuddin, before moving to Ross County, where he played for nearly four years, before joining Inverness Caledonian Thistle in June 1999.

He quickly made a name for himself as a strong, hard-tackling defender and soon became an important member of the first team. In his first season with Inverness, Golabek was a member of the team that famously beat Celtic in the Scottish Cup on 8 February 2000. In the seasons that followed, Golabek continued to work hard in the Inverness defence, and when Bobby Mann left the club in the summer of 2004, Golabek was made team captain.

The highlights of Stuart Golabek's career include two wins against Celtic in the Scottish Cup, winning the Scottish Challenge Cup in 2003 and winning the First Division in 2004 and 2010, all with Caley.

By January 2007, he made only two league appearances in the 2006–07 season and was going to be transferred to Peterhead on loan until the end of the season. However, this fell through and he went to Livingston on loan instead.

On 30 May 2007, it was announced that Golabek had joined Ross County on a free transfer. He became new manager Dick Campbell's first signing.

Golabek returned to Inverness in 2009, signing a one-year contract. He signed a contract extension to play in the Scottish Premier League for the 2010–11 season.

Brora Rangers

On 22 May 2011, it was announced that Golabek was due to return to the Highland League by joining Brora Rangers. He retired from playing in 2014.

References

External links
 

1974 births
Living people
Footballers from Inverness
Scottish footballers
Ross County F.C. players
Inverness Caledonian Thistle F.C. players
Livingston F.C. players
Scottish Premier League players
Scottish Football League players
Association football defenders
Clachnacuddin F.C. players
Brora Rangers F.C. players
Highland Football League players